The Ariel Award for Best Director (officially known as the Ariel Award for Best Directing) is an award presented by the Academia Mexicana de Artes y Ciencias Cinematográficas (AMACC) in Mexico. It is given in honor of a film director who has exhibited outstanding directing while working in the Mexican film industry. In 1947, the 1st and 2nd Ariel Awards were held, with Roberto Gavaldón and Emilio "El Indio" Fernández winning for the films La Barraca and Enamorada, respectively. With the exception of the years 1959 to 1971, when the Ariel Awards were suspended, the award has been given annually. Nominees and winners are determined by a committee formed every year consisting of academy members (active and honorary), previous winners and individuals with at least two Ariel nominations; the committee members submit their votes through the official AMACC website.

In 1953, filmmakers Luis Buñuel, Alfredo B. Crevenna and Gavaldón were nominated, but no winner was declared. Carlos Carrera and Fernández hold the record for most wins in the category, with four each. Carerra's El Crimen del Padre Amaro was nominated for the Academy Award for Best Foreign Language Film in 2003. Since 1976, Felipe Cazals has been nominated at least once every decade, winning three times for El Año de la Peste (1980), Bajo la metralla (1984), and Las Vueltas del Citrillo (2006). Buñuel and Amat Escalante won the Ariel for Best Director and the same award at the Cannes Film Festival for Los Olvidados and Heli, respectively. Alfonso Cuarón won the Ariel and the Academy Award for Best Direction, Cuarón is the first one to win both accolades for the same film. Since its inception, the award has been given to 40 directors. As of the 2022 ceremony, Alonso Ruizpalacios is the most recent winner in this category for her work on Una Película de Policías.

Winners and nominees

Multiple wins and nominations 

The following individuals have received multiple Best Director awards:

The following directors received four or more Best Director nominations:

See also 
 Academy Award for Best Director
 Best Director Award (Cannes Film Festival)

Notes

References

Ariel Awards
Awards for best director